The Penthouse is a sex comedy film starring Rider Strong, Corey Large, April Scott, James DeBello, Kaley Cuoco, Jimmy Jean-Louis, Jon Abrahams, and Mýa, the film was co-written and directed by Chris Levitus and released to DVD March 2, 2010.

Plot
The winner of a reality television show invites his two best friends to share the Los Angeles penthouse he won for coming in first place, and quickly finds out why living with your pals is not always the best idea. Realising that a bachelor pad is no fun when you are flying solo, Tyler (Large) invites Kieran (Strong) and another friend to come partake in the debauchery. A struggling writer who is reluctant to commit to his longtime girlfriend, Kieran quickly takes Tyler up on the offer, and before long life is one non-stop party. The strains in Tyler and Kieran's friendship start to show, however, when Tyler's flirtatious younger sister arrives for a visit, and puts the moves on Kieran.

Cast
 Rider Strong as Kieran 
 Corey Large as Tyler 
 James DeBello as Heath
 April Scott as Trista 
 Kaley Cuoco as Erica Roc 
 Mýa as Mitra 
 Nikki Griffin as Lexi 
 Lochlyn Munro as Barry 
 Jimmy Jean-Louis as Buzz McManus 
 Jon Abrahams as Tyler's Agent 
 Joe De La Rosa as Realtor 
 Brett Novek as Joey 
 Kurupt as 'Strangers' Host 
 Ed Begley, Jr. as Nicholas 
 Lin Shaye as Frances Roc 
 Patrick Durham as Agent X

Reception

References

External links
 
 

2010 films
2010s English-language films
American sex comedy films
2010s sex comedy films
2010 comedy films
2010s American films